A technician is a worker in a field of technology, who is proficient in the relevant skill and technique, with a relatively practical understanding of the theoretical principles.

Specialisation 
The term technician covers many different specialisations. These include:

 Theatrical technician
 School laboratory technician
 Engineering technician
 Laboratory technician
 Electronics technician

Campaigns 
In the UK, a shortage of skilled technicians in the science, engineering and technology sectors has led to various campaigns to encourage more people to become technicians and to promote the role of technician.

See also 
Grey-collar worker
Technical school
Tradesperson
Vocational education

References 

Broadcasting occupations
Mass media occupations
 
Television terminology